The year 1974 in radio involved some significant events.

Events
April 24–5 - Music aired on the radio in Portugal acts as a secret signal to trigger the Carnation Revolution there: at 10:55 p.m. on April 24, Paulo de Carvalho's "E Depois do Adeus" (Portugal's entry in the 1974 Eurovision Song Contest) on Emissores Associados de Lisboa alerts rebel captains and soldiers that the coup is beginning; at 12:20 a.m. on April 25, Rádio Renascença broadcasts "Grândola, Vila Morena", a song by Zeca Afonso, an influential political folk musician and singer who has been banned from Portuguese radio up to this time, signalling the Armed Forces Movement (MFA) to begin the takeover of strategic points of power in the country from 3.00 a.m.

Debuts
January 6 - CBS Radio Mystery Theater (1974–1982) debuts and is broadcast on 218 stations.
 February 19 - BRMB (now 96.4 BRMB) begins broadcasting to the Birmingham area
 April 2 - Piccadilly Radio (now Hits Radio Manchester) begins broadcasting to the Manchester area on MW and FM. The mediumwave signal (later   Piccadilly Gold, Piccadilly 1152, and Piccadilly Magic 1152) would cease operating in 2021. 
 April 3 - As tornadoes ravage much of the United States and Canada in what becomes known as the 1974 Super Outbreak, WHAS Louisville, Kentucky air-traffic reporter Dick Gilbert takes to the skies to track a twister as it rakes across the Louisville metro area. He, and the station, receive a Presidential commendation for their storm coverage.
 July 15 - Metro Radio begins broadcasting to the Newcastle upon Tyne area
 September - Paul Gambaccini first broadcasts on British radio, initially on BBC Radio 1.
 September 30 - Swansea Sound (now The Wave on FM), the first Independent Local Radio station in Wales, begins broadcasting to the Swansea area
 October 1 - Radio Hallam (now Hallam FM) begins broadcasting to the Sheffield area
 October 21 - Radio City (later City FM, now Radio City 96.7) begins broadcasting to the Liverpool area

Births
 February 6 - Aljo Bendijo, Filipino journalist and broadcaster
 February 22 - Chris Moyles British radio presenter (BBC Radio 1 etc.)
 March 28 - Scott Mills, British radio DJ
 May 3 - Peter Everitt, Australian rules footballer, later radio host
 June 13 - Katharina Bellowitsch, Austrian broadcast presenter
 June 21 - Natasha Desborough, British radio presenter
 July 14 - David Mitchell, English comic actor
 December 13 - Sara Cox, British broadcast presenter
 December 24 - Ryan Seacrest, American radio host

Deaths
 January 12 - Helen Claire, American actress on stage and radio, primarily in soap operas (born 1911)
 May 4 - Ludwig Koch, German-born British natural sound recordist (born 1881)
 July 14 - Elizabeth Reller, American actress on stage and radio (born 1913)
 July 28 - Truman Bradley, American radio actor (born 1905)
 November 11 - Jane Ace, American radio actress (born 1897)
 December 26 - Jack Benny, American comedian, vaudeville performer, and radio, television and film actor (born 1894)

References

 
Radio stations established in 1974
Radio by year